Cecropia multiflora is a species of plant in the family Urticaceae. It is endemic to Peru.

References

multiflora
Endemic flora of Peru
Near threatened plants
Trees of Peru
Taxonomy articles created by Polbot